Boye Hamilton Schlytter (22 October 1891 – 9 December 1977) was a Norwegian businessperson and mountain climber. He was president of Norsk Tindeklub from 1928 to 1948. In June 1936, he led the expedition to recover three bodies from Lihesten after the Havørn Accident. On 22 August, Schlytter and three others in the expedition were awarded the Medal for Heroic Deeds.

References
Bibliography
 
 

Notes

Norwegian mountain climbers
20th-century Norwegian businesspeople
1891 births
1977 deaths
Recipients of the Norwegian Medal for Heroic Deeds